C-type lectin domain family 4 member A is a protein that in humans is encoded by the CLEC4A gene.

This gene encodes a member of the C-type lectin/C-type lectin-like domain (CTL/CTLD) superfamily. Members of this family share a common protein fold and have diverse functions, such as cell adhesion, cell-cell signalling, glycoprotein turnover, and roles in inflammation and immune response. The encoded type 2 transmembrane protein may play a role in inflammatory and immune response. 

Multiple transcript variants encoding distinct isoforms have been identified for this gene. This gene is closely linked to other CTL/CTLD superfamily members on chromosome 12p13 in the natural killer gene complex region.

References

Further reading

External links
 

C-type lectins